Viking Terra is a region on the dwarf planet Pluto which lies just west of Sputnik Planum and south of Voyager Terra. It was discovered by the New Horizons probe during the July 2015 flyby of the dwarf planet. It is named after the Viking program.

References

Regions of Pluto